Honora dotella is a species of snout moth in the genus Honora. It was described by Harrison Gray Dyar Jr. in 1910. It is found in the US along the coastal mountains of California, from Monterey County southward.

The length of the forewings is 8.5-12.5 mm.

References

Moths described in 1910
Phycitinae